Melipona rufiventris, commonly known as tujuba in Brazil, is a species of eusocial stingless bee in the family Apidae and tribe Meliponini. It is endemic to Brazil.

References 

rufiventris
Hymenoptera of South America
Hymenoptera of Brazil
Insects described in 1836
Endemic fauna of Brazil